Steinheid is a village and a former municipality in the Sonneberg district of Thuringia, Germany. Since 1 December 2011, it is part of the town Neuhaus am Rennweg.

References

Former municipalities in Thuringia